Bulleit Bourbon is a brand of Kentucky straight bourbon whiskey produced at the Bulleit Distillery in Lebanon, Kentucky and the Bulleit Distillery in Shelbyville, Kentucky, for the Diageo beverage conglomerate.  It is characterized by a high rye content for a bourbon (at approximately 28% of the mash bill) and being aged at least six years. It is bottled  at 45% abv (90 proof) for the US, Canadian, British, Dutch and Mexican markets. For Australian and Danish markets, it is bottled at 40% abv. It is also sold in Germany, Norway and Sweden.

In the U.S. and other markets, Bulleit also offers a rye whiskey.

History
According to Tom Bulleit, son of a preacher, great-great-grandson of original creator Augustus Bulleit and developer of the modern brand, the first batch of Bulleit bourbon was made around 1830.  Augustus continued to produce it up until his death in 1860. The current recipe follows the original mash bill produced by Augustus Bulleit, which used two-thirds corn and one-third rye. As implemented today, Bulleit Bourbon is 68% corn, 28% rye and 4% malted barley.

Tom Bulleit began distilling his version in 1987, characterized by a high rye content and relatively lengthy aging.  He maintains that most phenol is filtered out.

Seagram bought the Bulleit brand in 1997 and began distilling it in Lawrenceburg, Kentucky.

The brand was widely introduced to US markets in 1999, and to Australia, UK and Germany in 2000.

Diageo acquired various Seagram's assets, including the Bulleit brand, which was then produced by its subsidiary Kirin Brewing Company at the same Lawrenceburg plant.

On March 14, 2017, Diageo opened a new Bulleit distillery. The  $115 million facility is located just east of Shelbyville in Shelby County, Kentucky.

In June 2019, Bulleit opened its visitors' center at its Shelbyville distillery in Kentucky. The Visitor Experience includes guided tours, a cocktail bar and an opportunity for visitors 21 years or older to design a customized Bulleit label to apply to their own bottles.

Bulleit family dispute  
Tom Bulleit's daughter Hollis left her position at Diageo in 2017 after 10 years, claiming she was being pushed out because she was a lesbian. A spokesperson from Diageo denies the claim.

Products
The current Bulleit bourbon whiskey mash bill contains 68% corn (maize), 28% rye, and 4% malted barley. It is bottled at 45% ABV.

Bulleit Bourbon Barrel Strength is a blend of barrels which are 5 to 8 years old. As it is being bottled straight from the barrel the proof varies by batch, ranging from 118-125 (59 to 62.5 ABV).
 
Bulleit Bourbon 10 Year is the only age dated Bulleit whiskey. It is bottled at 91.2 U.S. proof and has the same mash bill as the original Bulleit Bourbon. It won a Double Gold Medal at the 2013 San Francisco World Spirits Competition.

Bulleit rye whiskey, introduced in March 2011, has a mash bill of 95% rye and 5% malted barley. It is produced in Lawrenceburg, Indiana at MGP Indiana and bottled at 45% abv.

In Australia and the UK
Starting in 2008, Bulleit bourbon sold on the UK market is bottled at 40% alcohol by volume, which is re-exported to the Australia market. A 45% ABV version was introduced to the UK market in late 2014, under the label "Bulleit Frontier Whiskey".

Distilleries

Bulleit Shelbyville Distillery
3464 Benson Pike, Shelbyville, KY 40065

Bulleit Lebanon Distillery
100 Bourbon Drive, Lebanon, KY, 40033

Reviews
Proof66.com, a review aggregator for spirits, rates Bulleit bourbon in the top 10th percentile of the world's best whiskeys. The Bulleit Rye Whiskey is also rated a "Top Tier Whiskey". Proof66.com rates Bulleit Bourbon 10 Year as a "Tier 1" spirit with an overall rating of 551/904.

Bulleit Bourbon 10 Year received a gold medal in the Small Batch Bourbon up to 10 yrs category at the 2013 San Francisco World Spirits Competition.

Food critic Morgan Murphy said "This amber beauty, with its notes of spice, rye, and cedar, packs a stronger bite than its sweet aroma would imply."

References

External links
Official site

Bourbon whiskey
Diageo brands
Products introduced in 1999